Azteca constructor is a species of ant in the genus Azteca. Described by Emery in 1896, the species is endemic to several countries in Central America and South America.

References

constructor
Hymenoptera of North America
Hymenoptera of South America
Insects of Central America
Insects described in 1896